"Celia" is the fourth single by New Zealand recording artist Annah Mac, from the album Little Stranger.

Background
"Celia" was written and recorded by Annah Mac. She wrote the song after her friend, Celia, asked to write a song about her. The song is about "a best friend going astray, and trying to look after them." It was released as the fourth single from her album, Little Stranger.

Music video
The music video premiered on Annah Mac's YouTube channel, on September 9, 2011. It was directed by Darren Simmons, from Wanaka. It shows Annah Mac singing with a band in the park, playing on the beach, and walking around in giant ribbons. Towards the end of the video, you can see members of the band jumping rope.

Chart performance
On the New Zealand Artists Singles Chart, "Celia" debuted at number 16 on January 23, 2012. It eventually peaked at number 12 on January 30, 2012.

Charts

Track listing

References

Annah Mac songs
2011 songs
Sony Music singles